Orbital is a circular bus route in Leicester, UK. It is operated by Centrebus.

History 
Centrebus have operated the 40 service since around 2003 but the history can be traced back to the early 1980s.

As part of the Leicester bus partnership, Centrebus and Leicester City Council successfully applied for ZEBRA funding for electric vehicles to operate on service 40, these were launched on 24 October 2022.

Route 

Orbital currently provides journeys in clockwise and anticlockwise directions up to every hour Monday to Saturday, once funding has been secured additional electric buses will be launched which will see the frequency increase to every 15 minutes with evening and Sunday services launched.

Vehicles 
Orbital is currently operated with six Yutong E10 buses in a distinctive green livery with Orbital branding.

Centrebus originally operated a number of Dennis Darts on the service with Optare Esteem buses launched onto the route in 2007 which were replaced by Optare Solo SRs in 2016.

References 

Bus routes in England
Transport in Leicester
Circular bus routes